Facial onset sensory and motor neuronopathy, often abbreviated FOSMN, is a rare disorder of the nervous system in which sensory and motor nerves of the face and limbs progressively degenerate over a period of months to years. This degenerative process, the cause of which is unknown, eventually results in sensory and motor symptoms — the former consisting mainly of paresthesia followed by numbness, and the latter in muscle weakness, atrophy, and eventual paralysis. In many ways, it is reminiscent of the much better known condition amyotrophic lateral sclerosis, with which it is closely related. There is no cure; treatment is supportive. Life expectancy may be shortened by respiratory complications arising from weakness of the muscles that aid breathing and swallowing. It was first described in four patients by Vucic and colleagues working at the Massachusetts General Hospital in the United States; subsequent reports from the United Kingdom, Europe and Asia point to a global incidence of the disease. It is thought to be exceptionally rare, with only approximately 100 individuals described to date in the medical literature.


Signs and symptoms

Cause
The aetiology of FOSMN is unknown.

Diagnosis 
In common with many neurological diseases, there is no one 'test' for FOSMN. The diagnosis can be notoriously difficult, mainly on account of its rarity: even expert neurologists experienced in the diagnosis of diseases of the peripheral nervous system may not previously have encountered a case. The principal differential diagnosis to consider is amyotrophic lateral sclerosis or a related motor neurone disorder: the chief distinction between the two is the presence of sensory abnormalities in FOSMN, and their absence in the motor neurone disorders. Diagnostic tests such as nerve conduction studies, electromyography, cerebrospinal fluid analyses, and blood tests can help narrow the diagnostic possibilities and support a clinical diagnosis.

Treatment 
There is currently no cure for FOSMN. Supportive treatment, that enables patients to cope with symptoms, is usually helpful.

References

Neurology
Neuromuscular disorders
Motor neuron diseases
Rare diseases
Unsolved problems in neuroscience